

Events

Television
January – English-born Australian businessman Alan Bond purchases STW9 Perth for just under $50 million.
9 January – British children's animated series Towser debuts on ABC before airing on ITV in the UK months later.
16 January – Australian situation comedy series Mother and Son debuts on ABC.
30 January – Perfect Match is launched in the 5:30 p.m. timeslot, bringing in record ratings for that timeslot and ensuring Ten's Eyewitness News won the 6–7 p.m. timeslot
3 February – Australia's first nationally televised telethon screens on Network Ten. It is a 26-hour effort to raise money for Australia's Olympic athletes.
18 February – The Nine Network's Hey Hey It's Saturday moves from a Breakfast Television format to the 9:30 p.m. timeslot, Primetime format and rebranded as Hey Hey It's Saturday Night.
2 April – British children's stop motion animated series, Paddington, debuts on ABC.
9 April – Guy Blackmore joins Eyewitness News.
20 April – The Royal Children's Hospital Appeal is televised on Seven Network on Good Friday in Melbourne.
June – Christopher Skase purchases TVQ-0.
20 June – An electricity strike across Victoria cause all of Melbourne's TV stations to broadcast just two hours of programming closing down at 8:00 p.m.   
26 July – French-American-Canadian animated series Inspector Gadget debuts on ABC at 5:30 p.m..
July – Network Ten televises the 1984 Summer Olympics from Los Angeles. Also, all stations adopt a uniform on-air look for the first time.
8 October - Network Ten's long-running series, Prisoner, airs for the first time on British television under the title, "Prisoner: Cell Block H", on the ITV  Yorkshire Television region. TVS and Channel Television follows in 1986, and eventually, all fourteen ITV regions will air the series, with most commencing in 1987 (Thames, Central, TSW and STV) and 1988 (Granada, Border, Tyne Tees, Grampian, Anglia, HTV Wales and West, and UTV in 1989).
19 October – Long running Australian current affairs program Dateline premieres on Network 0-28.
22 October – The first ever television incarnation of the popular koala, The New Adventures of Blinky Bill, debuts on ABC.
The first televised federal election debate takes place.

Debuts
16 January – Mother and Son (ABC TV)
30 January – Perfect Match (Channel Ten)
18 February – Hey Hey It's Saturday Night (Channel Nine)
20 March – Waterfront (Channel Ten)
27 March – Eureka Stockade (Channel Seven)
1 June – Under Capricorn (Channel Nine)
11 June – Secret Valley (ABC TV)
2 July – Sweet and Sour (ABC TV)
16 July – Bodyline (Channel Ten)
30 July – The Love Game (Channel Seven)
17 October – City West (Network 0-28)
19 October – Dateline (Network 0-28)
22 October –  The New Adventures of Blinky Bill (ABC TV)
5 November – The Gillies Report (ABC TV)
29 November – Brass Monkeys (Channel Seven)

New International Programming
3 January –  St. Elsewhere (Channel Nine)
9 January –  Towser (ABC TV)
11 January –  Manions of America (Channel Nine)
30 January –  The Kwicky Koala Show (Channel Seven)
8 February –  The Last Song (ABC TV)
10 February –  Just Liz (ABC TV)
13 February –  The A-Team (Channel Ten)
15 February –  Blue Thunder (Channel Nine)
18 February –  The Gary Coleman Show (Channel Nine)
19 February –  V (1983) (Channel Ten)
28 February –  Boys from the Blackstuff (ABC TV)
2 March –  Automan (Channel Ten)
4 March –  Storybook International (Channel 0/28)
9 March –  The Machine Gunners (ABC TV)
16 March –  Jennifer Slept Here (Channel Nine)
2 April –  Paddington (ABC TV)
3 April –  Reilly, Ace of Spies (ABC TV)
13 April –  Give Us a Break (ABC TV)
14 April –  Newhart (Channel Nine)
15 April – / The Irish R.M. (ABC TV)
13 May –  Goodnight, Beantown (Channel Ten)
19 May –  Gilligan's Planet (Channel Ten)
27 May –  Winston Churchill: The Wilderness Years (ABC TV)
6 June –  Agatha Christie's Partners in Crime (Channel Seven)
7 June –  Scarecrow and Mrs. King (Channel Ten)
18 June –  AEIOU (ABC TV)
15 July –  The Wind in the Willows (ABC TV)
17 July –  All Electric Amusement Arcade (ABC TV)
20 July –  Auf Weidersehen, Pet (ABC TV)
25 July – / Maya the Honey Bee (Channel Ten – Melbourne)
26 July – // Inspector Gadget (ABC TV)
30 July –  Beau Geste (ABC TV)
6 August –  Cagney and Lacey (Channel Seven)
10 August –  Shine on Harvey Moon (ABC TV)
20 August –  Educating Marmalade (ABC TV)
22 August –  Alas Smith and Jones (ABC TV)
4 September –  A Woman Called Golda (Channel Ten)
7 September –  Rainbow Brite (Channel Seven)
17 September –  Robin of Sherwood (Channel Nine)
21 September –  Only Fools and Horses (ABC TV)
1 October –  The Black Adder (Channel Seven)
6 October/16 November –  Whiz Kids (6 October: Channel Seven – Melbourne, 16 November: Channel Seven – Sydney)
10 October –  Lifestyles of the Rich and Famous (Channel Nine)
14 October –  V: The Final Battle (Channel Ten)
22 October/3 November –  The Fantastic Miss Piggy Show (22 October: Channel Seven – Sydney, 3 November: Channel Seven – Melbourne)
22 October –  Mr. Smith (Channel Seven)
23 October –  The Dark Side of the Sun (ABC TV)
2 November –  Big Bird in China (ABC TV)
3 November –  Reggie (Channel Nine)
3 November –  Heathcliff (Channel Nine)
7 November –  Jane Eyre (1983) (ABC TV)
9 November –  Don't Eat the Pictures (ABC TV)
11 November –  Palmerstown, USA (Channel Nine)
14 November –  Gloria (Channel Nine)
14 November –  The Rousters (Channel Seven)
14 November –  Mika (Channel 0/28)
14 November –  Sorry! (ABC TV)
16 November –  Legmen (Channel Ten)
16 November –  The Duck Factory (Channel Nine)
17 November –  Manimal (Channel Seven)
17 November –  Mr. T (Channel Ten)
20 November –  Emerald Point N.A.S. (Channel Ten)
21 November –  3-2-1 Contact (ABC TV)
30 November –  Wizards and Warriors (Channel Ten)
7 December –  Just Our Luck (Channel Seven)
8 December –  The Doombolt Chase (Channel Seven)
 Shirt Tales (Channel Seven)
 Donkey Kong (Channel Seven)
 Mr. Hiccup (Channel 0/28)
 Masquerade (Channel Ten?)

Changes to network affiliation
This is a list of programs which made their premiere on an Australian television network that had previously premiered on another Australian television network. The networks involved in the switch of allegiances are predominantly both free-to-air networks or both subscription television networks. Programs that have their free-to-air/subscription television premiere, after previously premiering on the opposite platform (free-to air to subscription/subscription to free-to air) are not included. In some cases, programs may still air on the original television network. This occurs predominantly with programs shared between subscription television networks.

International

Television shows

1950s
 Mr. Squiggle and Friends (1959–1999)

1960s
 Four Corners (1961–present)

1970s
 Hey Hey It's Saturday (1971–1999, 2009–2010)
 Young Talent Time (1971–1989)
 Countdown (1974–1987)
 60 Minutes (1979–present)
 Prisoner (1979–1986)

1980s
 Kingswood Country (1980–1984)
 Sale of the Century (1980–present)
 Wheel of Fortune (1981–present)
 Sunday (1981–present)
 Today (1982–present)

Ending this year

Returning this year

TV movies

Births
24 August – Erin Molan, journalist and TV presenter

See also
 1984 in Australia
 List of Australian films of 1984

References